Barbarea (winter cress or yellow rocket) is a genus of about 22 species of flowering plants in the family Brassicaceae, native to temperate regions of the Northern Hemisphere, with the highest species diversity in southern Europe and southwest Asia. They are small herbaceous biennial or perennial plants with dark green, deeply lobed leaves and yellow flowers with four petals.

Selected species

Barbarea australis
Barbarea balcana
Barbarea bosniaca
Barbarea bracteosa
Barbarea conferta
Barbarea hongii
Barbarea intermedia
Barbarea lepuznica
Barbarea longirostris
Barbarea orthoceras
Barbarea rupicola
Barbarea sicula
Barbarea stricta
Barbarea taiwaniana
Barbarea verna
Barbarea vulgaris

Uses
They grow quickly into dandelion-like rosettes of edible, cress-like foliage. Barbarea verna, also known as upland cress, early winter cress, American cress, Belle Isle cress and scurvy grass, is used in salads or to add a nippy taste to mixed greens for cooking.

Chemical compounds
Winter cress contains different glucosinolates, flavonoids and saponins.

See also
 Rocket (arugula)

References

External links
Flora Europaea: Barbarea
Flora of China: Barbarea

 
Brassicaceae genera
Leaf vegetables